Johannes Brüggen Messtorff better known by his hispanized name Juan Brüggen (Lübeck, Germany, April 25, 1887 – March 7, 1953, Santiago de Chile) was a German-Chilean geologist. One of his most famous works is the extensive treaty of Fundamentos de la geología de Chile published in 1950. Brüggen Glacier in the Southern Patagonian Ice Field is named after him.

Two of Brüggen's students established the geology degree at the University of Chile; Jorge Muñoz Cristi and Héctor Flores Williams.

See also
Pablo Groeber
Henning Illies
Gustav Steinmann

References

20th-century Chilean geologists
20th-century German geologists
Scientists from Lübeck
German emigrants to Chile
1887 births
1953 deaths
Academic staff of the University of Chile